Bétérou is a town and arrondissement located in the Borgou Department of central Benin. As of 2009 it had an estimated population of 15,236.

Populated places in Benin